Sung Chang (born 1986) is a South Korean concert pianist.  He attracted international attention when he became the youngest ever to win the Nagoya International Piano Competition in Japan.

Biography 
Sung Chang was born in Seoul, Korea, Chang began music as a young child, inspired by his pianist mother.  Sung Chang gave his debut concert at the age of five.  At 16 he was accepted into the prestigious Korea National University of Arts, where he completed his undergraduate degree.  Chang traveled to Hannover, Germany, to continue his studies under the tutelage of Vladimir Krainev and Ewa Kupiec, and completed the Master of Music “Künstlerische Ausbildung” and a postgraduate program “Soloklasse" at the Hochschule für Musik, Theater und Medien Hannover.  After completing his studies in Germany, he came to the United States and finished further studies at the USC Thornton School of Music.

Career 
He has received critical acclaim for his “poetic imagination, superb technical skills, and, most importantly, a deep emotional connection to whatever music he plays” by Jeffrey Kahane.  With over 20 concerti and many complete recital programs in his repertoire, Chang has been engaged as a soloist in Germany, Italy, The Netherlands, France, Czech Republic, Japan, Taiwan, China, Korea, and the United States.  He has performed solo recitals at the Concertgebouw, Teatro Lirico di Cagliari, and Seoul Arts Center.  Last season alone, Chang performed in more than fifteen major cities across the U.S., including Walt Disney Concert Hall in Los Angeles, where he performed Liszt's Concerto No.1.  He also has appeared as a guest soloist with the Phoenix Symphony Orchestra, KBS Symphony Orchestra, Kyung-Ki Philharmonic Orchestra, HMTM Hannover Orchestra, Taejon Symphony Orchestra, Wonju Symphony Orchestra, and KNUA Symphony Orchestra.  In March 2019 he will be performing the Grieg Piano Concerto with the Louisiana Philharmonic Orchestra under the baton of Maestro Carlos Prieto.

Chamber Music

As a founder of the LAE quartet (Los Angeles Ensembles quartet), he is an active chamber recitalist in the greater Los Angeles area.  He garnered the first prize, audience prize, and the Schubert special prize in the International Schubert Competition for Piano Duo. The winter of 2018, he and the violinist YuEun Kim received the 2nd prize at the Boulder International Chamber Music Competition: The Art of Duo. This duo performed the complete Beethoven Violin Sonatas, all within a span of three weeks, at the USC Thorton School of Music.  He currently serves as a music director/conductor for the Beethoven Project Orchestra in Orange County, California. They performed the Beethoven Piano Concerto No.1, 2, and the Triple Concerto in 2018.

Awards 
Chang has gone on to win more than ten international competitions around the world including in the United States, Germany, Italy, Korea, and Japan.  His awards from the major international piano competitions includes- the first prize and the audience prize at the Chopin-Gesellschaft Hannover Internationaler Klavierwettbewerb, the first prize and the special award for the "Best Performance of a Virtuoso Piece" at the Bösendorfer USASU International Piano Competition, a silver medal with two special prizes in "Best Performance of a Work by a Classical Composer" and "Best Performance of a Work by a Spanish, Latin American or Impressionistic Composer" at the San Antonio International Piano Competition, and a silver medal at the New Orleans International Piano Competition.

List of awards

Discography 

In November 2018, Sung released his first CD Aleph.

References 

 Imagination Fuels Sung Chang". TPR interview. Retrieved Feb.11, 2019.
 San Antonion International Competition". The Gurwitz IPC. Retrieved Feb.11, 2019.
 Chopin - Hannover". Retrieved Feb.11, 2019.
 River Report write-up". Retrieved Feb.11, 2019.
 GCRT Candidate Sung Chang wins.."  Retrieved Feb.11, 2019.
 Boulder International Chamber Competition". Retrieved Feb.11, 2019.
 Phoenix Symphony Orchestra - Classics 11". Retrieved Feb.11, 2019.
 New Orleans International Piano Competition ends on a high note".  Retrieved Feb.11, 2019
 차세대 한인 연주자들, 베토벤 소나타 전곡 연주". 한국일보 (in Korean). Retrieved Feb.11, 2019
 감동이 있는 크리스마스 패밀리 나잇". 한국일보 (in Korean). Retrieved Feb.11, 2019
 중앙음악 콩쿠르 영광의 얼굴".  중앙일보(in Korean). Retrieved Feb.11, 2019

External links
 Official site

Living people
1986 births